Kristjan Kais (born 3 March 1976) is a retired Estonian beach volleyball player. With teammate Rivo Vesik, he represented Estonia in beach volleyball at the 2008 Summer Olympics in Beijing, China.

Achievements

Overall FIVB World Tour results

Personal
He is married to Liina Kais (born Uibopuu).

References

External links
 
 

1976 births
Living people
Sportspeople from Pärnu
Estonian beach volleyball players
Men's beach volleyball players
Beach volleyball players at the 2008 Summer Olympics
Olympic beach volleyball players of Estonia